Federal College of Education (Special), Oyo was established on 5 October 1977 as Federal Advanced Teacher's college (Special). The institution, according to a UNDP/UNESCO 1996 report (NIR/87/008) "... Has the best qualified Staff in Special Education not only in Nigeria but in West, North, East and Central Africa." The college is the only one of its kind in Nigeria and sub-Saharan Africa. It has the largest conglomeration of disabled students that could be found in any Higher institution in Nigeria and the largest concentration of specialized facilities for teaching and training of teachers of the Handicapped in Nigeria. During its 40th anniversary celebrations, the college gave special recognition award to former President Olusegun obasanjo whose military administration brought about the upgrading of the institution from the then Federal Advanced Teachers College to a College of Education with the mandate to award the National Certificate of Education in 1977.

Schools

 School of Secondary Education - Arts & Social Sciences 
 School of General Education 
 School of Secondary Education - Languages 
 School of Secondary Education - Sciences Programmes 
 School of Special Education 
 School of Secondary Education - Vocational & Technical Education 
 School of Early Childhood Care, Primary and Adult & Non Formal Education
 school of General Studies Education

Courses
The courses offered by the institution are list out below;
 Primary Education Studies
 Education and Mathematics
 Special Education/Agricultural Science
 Special Education/Economics
 Special Education/Social Studies
 Special Education/Christian Religion Studies
 Special Education/Islamic Studies
 Special Education/Geography 
 Special Education/Biology
 Special Education/English
The institution also attaches students to workplaces for gaining practical experience through the SIWES programme.

The Provost

The President and Commander- in- Chief of the Armed Forces, President Mohammadu Buahari appointed Professor Usman, Kamoru Olayiwola as the sixth substantive Provost of the college and he assumed duty on 7 August 2015.  Before his appointment, Professor K. O. Usman was a Professor of Mathematics Education at the University of Nigeria, Nsukka.

References

External links
 www.fcesoyo.edu.ng

1977 establishments in Nigeria
Federal colleges of education in Nigeria
Special education
Educational institutions established in 1977
Universities and colleges in Oyo State